Jaguaré is a Brazilian municipality.

Jaguaré may also refer to:

Jaguaré (district of São Paulo), subprefecture in São Paulo, Brazil
Associação Jaguaré Esporte Clube, known as Jaguaré, Brazilian football club
Villa Lobos-Jaguaré (CPTM), train station in São Paulo, Brazil
Jaguaré (footballer) (1905-1946), Jaguaré Bezerra de Vasconcelos, Brazilian footballer

See also
Jaguar (disambiguation)